(7 March 1932 – 5 November 1998), born , was a Japanese film, stage and television actress.

She is best known for her roles in the original  Godzilla, playing the character of Emiko Yamane (a role she reprised in Godzilla vs. Destoroyah in 1995), and in The Mysterians, playing Hiroko Iwamoto.

Personal life
Kōchi's paternal grandfather was Viscount Masatoshi Ōkōchi, the third director of Riken; her father, a painter, was the second son of Masatoshi. Her husband, television producer Sadataka Hisamatsu, with whom she had a daughter, was descended from the Hisamatsu-Matsudaira clan who ruled over the Imabari Domain.

Ancestry

Biography

After graduating from Japan Women's University's affiliated high school, Kōchi worked as an office lady, but she joined Toho through their "New Face" program in April 1953, along with Akira Takarada, Kenji Sahara, Yū Fujiki, and Masumi Okada (who later moved to Nikkatsu). One year later, she acted in movies directed by Kajirō Yamamoto.

It was in one of Yamamoto's movies that his protégé, Ishirō Honda, saw Kōchi while he was making a science fiction film, Godzilla, with a topical storyline. Honda chose her to play the main female role of Emiko Yamane. While her role served as the center of the movie's romantic subplot, it provided the purpose for the resolution of the main story. Even though she was inexperienced as an actress at the time, her role was excellent as she hoped for, and she did very well in it.

After her success in Godzilla, Kōchi was typecast in other science fiction and kaiju films, including Half Human and The Mysterians. She left Toho in 1958 to pursue her formal study of acting, which she did not receive upon early discovery in 1953.

One year after leaving Toho, Kōchi did her formal study of acting with Tsutomu Yamazaki and Kumi Mizuno and joined Haiyuza Theatre Company. She then debuted as a stage actress in William Shakespeare's Twelfth Night.

Kōchi made some appearances on TBS drama specials produced by Fukuko Ishii and written by Sugako Hashida.

In 1995, Takao Okawara offered Kōchi the chance to reprise her role as Emiko Yamane in Godzilla vs. Destoroyah. Although Otawara was used to working with younger actors, he was impressed by Kōchi's complete training and concentration. All of her scenes were completed in one day, and her cameo appearance attracted the public throughout Japan. She later recounted her appearance in an interview with CNN: "After the first Godzilla movie people pointed at me saying, 'Godzilla, Godzilla, Godzilla.' As a young woman I hated Godzilla, so I thought, 'no more Godzilla for me.' But 41 years later I watched the film again and realized how great it was for its anti-nuclear theme."

On 19 July 1997, Kōchi's last film, was released. Two days later, on 21 July, she made a guest appearance in a TBS Monday Drama Special, .

During the tour, she complained about her poor health, and she was diagnosed with colon cancer in January 1998. Her cancer spread rapidly, and she did not undergo surgery at the time of diagnosis. One year earlier, on 15 December, her final performance was in Tsuruoka, Yamagata.

Kōchi continued her hospitalisation until she died on 5 November 1998 at the Japanese Red Cross Medical Center in Hiroo, Shibuya from colon cancer at the age of 66. On 29 October, a week before her death, she was baptised into the Roman Catholic Church under her baptismal name of "Maria" by Father Masahiro Kondō of the Congregation of the Most Holy Redeemer.  Her funeral was held on 9 November at St. Ignatius Church.  Her grave is at Yanaka Cemetery in Taitō.

Episodes
 Since childhood, Kōchi showed off her photograph, "My Lover," in which she was depicted with her grandfather Masatoshi.
 On 31 December 1957, Kōchi visited São Paulo for the opening of Toho's branch in Brazil with another Toho actress, Machiko Kitagawa (who would later become the wife of Kiyoshi Kodama).  They then went to New York City in the United States to participate in the Japanese cinema exhibition.  On 12 February 1958, they returned to Japan.  At the time, worldwide travel liberalisation was still underway, and their visits to São Paulo and New York City became very valuable.

Selected filmography

Film

TV Series

See also
 Sanezumi Fujimoto

References

External links

河内桃子 at allcinema 
河内桃子 at KINENOTE 
河内桃子 at MovieWalker 
河内桃子 at ◇テレビドラマデータベース◇ 

1932 births
1998 deaths
20th-century Japanese actresses
Actresses from Tokyo
Converts to Roman Catholicism
Deaths from cancer in Japan
Deaths from colorectal cancer
Hisamatsu clan
Japanese film actresses
Japanese Roman Catholics
Japanese stage actresses
Japanese television actresses
Ōkōchi clan
People from Taitō
Shakespearean actresses